Crocus almehensis  is a species of flowering plant in the genus Crocus of the family Iridaceae. It is a cormous perennial native to northeastern Iran.

References

almehensis